The Kuns or Kuny (Russian Куны) are a Turkic ethnic group of Eastern Europe that may have originally been synonymous with the Cumans: both peoples are known in Hungarian as Kunok and a region of Hungary traditionally inhabited by Cumans is known in Hungarian as Kunság. However, the Kuny are distinguished (possibly erroneously) from the Cumans in some Medieval Hungarian and Russian sources and appear alongside them.

While they were first described, during the Early Middle Ages, as living in Inner Asia and speaking a Turkic language, many of the Kuny later migrated through Russia to Hungary.

History
At the beginning of the 7th century trekked north of the Gobi Desert. In the 8th and 9th centuries included in Uyghur Khaganate. Migrated to the upper Yenisei, being adjacent to the Kayi.

About subsequent events al-Marwazi reports that Kayi pushed Kuns, and those, in turn, the Sari (i.e. the Polovtsians or Kipchaks).

In the 11th to 13th centuries, the name Kuns occurs in Hungarian and Russian ancient books along with the Cumans, Kipchaks.Pechenegs and/or  Uz.

According to one version, the tribe Toksoba referred to various primary sources, was Kuns, and this period corresponded to the Don Polovtsians. There is also a version of that the Russian name of Polovtsians - Sarochins evolved from two roots - Sari and Kuns.

Descendants of ancient Kuns

Currently Kuns - call themselves part of the Hungarians, erecting their genealogy back to medieval Kuns-Toksoba from the Cuman-Kipchak confederation. Kuns in Hungary mainly live in areas Kunshag Small and Large Kunshag. According to official historiography of Hungary known that Kuns consistently settled Danube - two migrations. The first was in the 11th century, the second - at Köten-Khan in the 13th century.

Descendants of the Toksoba Kuns live in the South Ural - including members of Bashkirian clans such as the Qipsaq, Nughay-Buryjan and Teleu.

See also

 Cumans
 Cumania
 Kipchaks

Bibliography

Kipchaks
Turkic peoples of Europe
Nomadic groups in Eurasia